Alexander Comyn, 2nd Earl of Buchan (died 1289) was a Scoto-Norman magnate who was one of the most important figures in the 13th century Kingdom of Scotland.  He was the son of William Comyn, jure uxoris Earl of Buchan, and Marjory, Countess of Buchan, the heiress of the last native Scottish Mormaer of Buchan, Fergus. He was the chief counsellor of Alexander III, King of Scots for the entire period of the king's majority and, as Scotland's leading magnate, played a key role in safeguarding the independence of the Scottish monarchy.  During his long career, Alexander Comyn was Justiciar of Scotia (1258–89), Constable of Scotland (1275–89), Sheriff of Wigtown (1263–66), Sheriff of Dingwall (1264–66), Ballie of Inverie (in Knoydart) and finally, Guardian of Scotland (1286–89) during the first interregnum following the death of Alexander III. In 1284 he joined with other Scottish noblemen who acknowledged Margaret of Norway as the heiress to King Alexander. He died sometime after 10 July 1289.

Alexander had at least nine children with his wife, Elizabeth, daughter of Roger de Quincy, 2nd Earl of Winchester:

 John Comyn, 3rd Earl of Buchan, Alexander's successor as Earl of Buchan
 Roger
 Lord Alexander Comyn, sheriff of Aberdeen, married Joan, sister of William le Latimer, and had issue. Henry de Beaumont would claim the Earldom of Buchan through marriage to their daughter, Alice.
 Lord William Comyn, Provost of St. Mary's Church, St. Andrews
 Lady Marjorie Comyn, m. Patrick Dunbar, 8th Earl of Dunbar
 Lady Agnes Egidia Comyn, m. Maol Íosa III, Earl of Strathearn
 Lady Elisabetha Comyn, m. Gilbert de Umfraville, 1st Earl of Angus
 Lady Elena Comyn, m. Sir William de Brechin
 Lady Annora Comyn, m. Nicholas de Soules

References

Notes

Sources

Rymer, Thomas,Foedera Conventiones, Literae et cuiuscunque generis Acta Publica inter Reges Angliae. London. 1745. (Latin) 
Young, Alan, Robert the Bruce's Rivals: The Comyns, 1213–1314, (East Linton, 1997)
Young, Alan & Cumming, George, The Real Patriots of Early Scottish Independence, Birlinn, (Edinburgh, 2014)

External links
Medieval Lands Project on Alexander Comyn

Comyn, Alexander
Comyn, Alexander
Year of birth unknown
Clan Comyn
Comyn, Alexander
Comyn, Alexander
Comyn, Alexander
13th-century mormaers